Kenneth "Ken" Eugene Johnson (born March 25, 1955) is a former American football defensive end in the National Football League. After playing college football for Knoxville College, Johnson was drafted by the Buffalo Bills in the 4th round (83rd overall) of the 1979 NFL Draft. He played six seasons for the Buffalo Bills (1979–1984) and two game for the Kansas City Chiefs during the 1987 strike shortened season.

References

1955 births
Living people
Players of American football from Nashville, Tennessee
American football defensive ends
Knoxville Bulldogs football players
Buffalo Bills players
Kansas City Chiefs players